Musa Bello (b. 1919–1975) was the 11th Etsu Nupe in Nupe kingdom reigns from 1967 to his death in 1975 and was succeeded by the 12th Etsu Nupe Umaru Sanda Ndayako.

Background 
his father was the seventh Etsu Nupe Bello Maliki. He had his entire education in Bida Emirate and later he became the head district of Badeggi in 1965 and Katcha before then he worked at Kaduna contractor company.

Ruling house 
He belong to the second house of rulings house, house Masaba in Nupe Kingdom and Bida Emirates. He is a grandfather to the present 13th Etsu Nupe Yahaya Abubakar, and uncle to the 12th Etsu Nupe Umaru Sanda Ndayako both came in a different rulings house but the same great grandfather Malam Dendo.

Notes 

Etsu Nupe
1919 births
1975 deaths
Emirs of Bida
Nupe
Nigerian traditional rulers
People from Bida